The action of 4 July 1773 was an engagement of the first Russo-Turkish War (1768–74), between naval units of Russian Empire and the Ottoman Empire.

This indecisive battle took place on 4 July 1773 between 2 small Russian vessels under Jan Hendrik van Kinsbergen and 4 Ottoman ships.

Ships involved 
Russian Empire
Taganrog 16
Koron 16

Ottoman Empire
? 52
? 52
? 52
? 24 (xebec)

References
 

Conflicts in 1773
1773
Military history of the Black Sea